Shemar Stewart (born November 2003) is an American football defensive end for the Texas A&M Aggies. He was raised in Miramar, Florida, and attended Monsignor Pace Academy in Miami Gardens. He was rated as one of the top recruits in the 2022 college football recruiting class, receiving the No. 7 rating from ESPN, No. 9 from 247Sports, and No. 12 from USA Today. He was also rated as the top edge rusher in the 2022 recruiting class. He received a scholarship from Texas A&M University and committed to that school on national signing day in February 2022.

References

External links
 Texas A&M bio

Living people
American football defensive ends
Georgia Bulldogs football players
Players of American football from Florida
2003 births